Vincent Goodyer, better known as 18yoman, stylized in capitals, is an Australian singer, songwriter, instrumentalist and record producer based in Sydney. He is an ARIA Award recipient and has co-produced a Grammy Award nominated album.

Career
A Bunaba Australian, 18yoman started working on records alongside regular collaborator Adit Gauchan (Horrorshow, Turquoise Prince), with whom he co-produced Spit Syndicate's 2018 album Orbit. He scored the feature documentary film, Martha: A Picture Story which premiered at Tribeca Film Festival and was nominated for an AACTA Award for Best Score in a Documentary Film.

He later worked on albums from the likes on Triple One and Daniyel before winning an ARIA Award for his production on neo-soul heroine Kaiit's single "Miss Shiney".

In late 2020, he signed with Take a Daytrip imprint No Idle, a joint venture with Universal Music Publishing Group, while also launching his own publishing house Banquet Sounds and signing friend and frequent collaborator Glenn Hopper/LEN20.

18yoman then co-produced two tracks on Kid Cudi's third incarnation of his Man on the Moon album trilogy Man on the Moon III: The Chosen, co-wrote Cordae and Young Thug's single "Wassup" and also featured on Australian soul upstart KYE's single "Gold" featuring Sampa the Great.

Alongside collaborators Billy Ward and Len20, 18yoman arranged, composed and recorded the strings for Lil Nas X's debut album Montero released on Columbia, while also co-writing "Am I Dreaming" featuring Miley Cyrus, alongside Ward, Take a Daytrip and Omer Fedi.

In 2022, 18yoman received writing and production credits on Rico Nasty's mixtape Las Ruinas, alongside Roy Lenzo and Grasps, before working on YG's 2022 single "Alone".

Awards and nominations
 Won – 2019 ARIA Music Award for Best Soul/R&B Release (Kaiit's "Miss Shiney")
 Nominated − 2022 Grammy Award for Best Album (Lil Nas X's Montero)
 Nominated − 2019 AACTA Award for Best Original Music Score in a Documentary (Martha: A Picture Story)
 Nominated − 2022 AACTA Award for Best Original Score in Television (Mystery Road: Origin)

Discography
Singles
As 18yoman
 "Eye Catcher" – 2019
 "Full to the Brim" – 2019
 "Swimming" (ft. Mia Elnekave) – 2019
 "Fireflies" – 2020

As featured artist
 "Vinny's Interlude" (UNO Stereo ft. 18yoman) – 2020
 "Gold" (KYE ft. Sampa the Great & 18yoman) – 2021

Production discography

References

External links

Living people
Musicians from Sydney
Aboriginal peoples of New South Wales
Australian record producers
21st-century Australian musicians
Year of birth missing (living people)